Ie (formerly Ee) is a village in the northern Netherlands. It is located in the municipality of Noardeast-Fryslân, Friesland, east of Dokkum. Ie had approximately 834 inhabitants in January 2017. Before 2019, the village was part of the Dongeradeel municipality.

There are various types of buildings in Ie, including a church built in the 13th century. A flax museum of the Netherlands is also located in Ie. Ie has mostly remained an intact rural village.

Ee has the shortest name of all places in the Netherlands.

History 
The village was first mentioned in 1450 as Ee, and means "water / river". Ie is a terp (artificial living mound) village with a radial structure. It developed several centuries before Christ. The Dutch Reformed church dates from the 16th century and has a 13th century nave. The tower was built in 1869. Up to 1729, a dike made inland navigation, and the nearby hamlet of  had to be used as inland harbour.

Ie was densely populated. There was no construction outside the terp until the 18th century. In 1840, Ie was home to 904 people.

Transportation 
The N 358 passes through town.

Bus routes 63 and 562 connect Ie with Dokkum.

Gallery

References

External links

Noardeast-Fryslân
Populated places in Friesland